Eldon Square may refer to:

 Old Eldon Square, a square in Newcastle-upon Tyne formerly known as Eldon Square
 Eldon Square Shopping Centre, a shopping centre built around the above
 Eldon Square Bus Station